Natrella is a surname. Notable people with the surname include:

Mary Gibbons Natrella (1922–1988), American statistician
Laurent Natrella, one of the Sociétaires of the Comédie-Française
Vito Natrella, Fellow of the American Statistical Association, brother-in-law of Mary Gibbons Natrella